Shanhai Pass or Shanhaiguan is one of the major passes in the Great Wall of China, being the easternmost stronghold along the Ming Great Wall, and commands the narrowest choke point in the Liaoxi Corridor. It is located in Shanhaiguan District, Qinhuangdao, Hebei province, on the east bank of the Shi River between the Yan Mountains and the Liaodong Bay coast.

In 1961, the pass was selected as the Major Historical and Cultural Site Protected at the National Level by the State Council of China, and it was listed as part of the Great Wall as a World Heritage Site by the UNESCO in 1987.

The pass is a popular tourist destination at the eastern terminal point of the Ming dynasty Great Wall. The location where the wall meets the Bohai Sea is nicknamed "Old Dragon's Head" (老龙头).

Throughout Chinese history, the pass served as a frontline defensive outpost against ethnic groups from Northeast China (Manchuria), including the Khitan, Jurchen and the Manchus. Shanhai Pass is the starting point of the eastern end of the Great Wall, and is the first barrier for guarding the frontier, therefore it is called the "First Pass Under Heaven" (天下第一关).

History
Located south of Yan Mountain, and north of the Bohai Sea, for centuries the pass guarded the narrow passage between Northeast and Central East China. The Northern Qi dynasty, Sui dynasty and the Tang dynasty constructed passes here. The site was called Yuguan during the Tang dynasty and by 785, a garrison was established there. Eight more garrisons were established from Yuguan to Jinniukou. During the Later Tang and Five Dynasties periods, the territory was controlled by autonomous governors. No garrisons (except Yuguan) remained by the Five Dynasties period.  The area and the passes were then controlled by the Liao dynasty. The Liao founded Qianmin County east of Yuguan in present-day Shanhaiguan. Garrisons were built in the area under the Jin and Yuan dynasties. In 1381, Ming general Xu Da and his soldiers were ordered to repair the old Yongping (永平) and Jieling (界岭) passes. From this, they constructed the present pass, which was named Shanhaiguan (literally "mountain-sea-pass") because of its location between the mountains and the sea. In the late 16th century, Ming general Qi Jiguang began fortification and construction of a military city around the pass, building cities and forts to the east, south and north, making it one of the most heavily fortified passes in China.

During the Qianlong Emperor's reign under the Qing dynasty, Shanhai Pass became the seat of Linyu County (临榆县城) under the jurisdiction of Yongping Mansion (永平府). In the late Qing dynasty, many forts were built to strengthen coastal defense. During the period of the Republic of China, the pass was under the control of Zhang Zuolin's Fengtian clique, Chiang Kai-shek's Nationalist government, the Imperial Japanese Army, and the Jireliao Military Region (冀热辽军区). It was taken over by the Northeast Field Army on November 27, 1948. After the founding of the People's Republic of China, Shanhai Pass was once under the jurisdiction of Liaoxi Province, and later under the jurisdiction of Hebei Province.

Today, Shanhai Pass is one of the best preserved passes in the Great Wall.

Battle of Shanhai Pass

In 1644, Li Zicheng led a rebel army into the Ming dynasty capital of Beijing, marking the official end of the Ming dynasty. After occupying the capital, Li attempted to enlist the support of Ming general Wu Sangui, commander of the powerful Ningyuan garrison north of the Great Wall. Rather than submit to Li's new Shun dynasty, Wu contacted the Manchu Qing dynasty, suggesting that they combine forces to drive the rebels from the capital. Dorgon, regent of the Qing, marched his army to Shanhai Pass to receive Wu's surrender. Together, Wu and the Manchus defeated Li Zicheng's army near the pass, and Li was forced to abandon the capital. The Qing victory enabled their army to enter Beijing unopposed, and established them as the dominant power in China.

Later history

During the Qing era, the Shanhai Pass, situated between Shenyang and Beijing, was referred to as the "Key to the Capitals". During the Republican era, as well as during the Eight-Nation Alliance and World War II, the pass witnessed many conflicts.

The 1911 Encyclopædia Britannica noted:
"SHANHAI-KWAN, a garrison town in the extreme east of the province of Chih-li, China. Pop. about 30,000. It is situated at the point where the range of hills carrying the Great Wall of China dips to the sea, leaving a kwon or pass of limited extent between China proper and Manchuria. It is thus an important military station, and the thoroughfare of trade between Manchuria and the great plain of China. The Imperial Northern railway from Tientsin and Taku, 174 m. from the former, runs through the pass, and skirts the shore of the Gulf of Liao-tung as far as the treaty port of Niu-chwang, where it connects with the railways leading from Port Arthur to the Siberian main line. The pass formed the southern limit of the Russian sphere of influence as defined in the convention between Great Britain and Russia of the 28th of April 1899."

In July1900, 15,000 Imperial Japanese Army troops landed at Shanhai Pass as part of the Eight-Nation Alliance, prior to marching on Beijing to relieve the Siege of the International Legations by the Boxers. A pre-landing bombardment of the area was unnecessary as few Chinese troops were present. Inter-allied relations were dealt a blow when a drunken fracas occurred at the Shanhai Pass between Japanese and French troops. In the fighting three French and seven Japanese soldiers were killed, and five French and 12 Japanese were wounded.

In November 1945, the North Eastern People's Liberation Army (PLA) attempted to hold Shanhaiguan against Kuomintang forces attacking from the south. They sought to keep Chiang Kai-shek's Nationalist government out of Manchuria. The People's Liberation Army forces of 10,000 were under equipped and too few to defend the position and retreated to Siping. Later, after the Communist Party began to gain the upper hand in the Chinese Civil War, the city became a destination for refugees fleeing the Liaoshen campaign.

Structure 

The east, south and north sides are surrounded by a deep, wide moat with drawbridges over it. In the middle of the pass stands a tall bell tower.

All four sides of the Shanhai Pass once possessed a gate or mén, with the Zhèndōng Gate in the east wall, the Yíng'ēn Gate in the west, the Wàngyáng Gate in the south and the Wēiyuǎn Gate in the north. Due to lack of repairs over the centuries, only the Zhèndōng Gate remains today. This was the most important gate due to its position, which faces outside the pass towards Beijing.

Transport 
Shanhaiguan railway station on Beijing-Harbin railway and Tianjian-Shanhaiguan railway is the nearest railway station to reach Shanhai Pass.

See also
Lady Meng Jiang
Other notable Pass in China:
Jiayu Pass
Juyong Pass
Hangu Pass
Yanmen Pass

References

Bibliography

External links

Photos of Shanhaiguan
Great Wall of China Man made Object
 Illustrated Atlas of Shanhai, Yongping, Jizhou, Miyun, Gubeikou, Huanghua Zhen and Other Areas

Mountain passes of China
Great Wall of China
Major National Historical and Cultural Sites in Hebei
Buildings and structures in Qinhuangdao
Landforms of Hebei